I'm Not a Policeman is the debut EP by Cartman and was released February 8, 1999.

Track listing
 "Drive" - 3:46  
 "Leave It Out" - 4:22
 "I'm Not a Policeman" - 3:40
 "Sugarcane" - 4:42
 "Pieces" (Acoustic Version) - 3:57

Personnel
 Cain Turnley
 Joe Hawkins
 Scott Nicholls
 Ben Mills

References

Cartman (band) EPs
1999 debut EPs